The following is a list of the 67 counties of the U.S. state of Pennsylvania. The city of Philadelphia is coterminous with Philadelphia County, the municipalities having been consolidated in 1854, and all remaining county government functions having been merged into the city after a 1951 referendum. Eight of the ten most populous counties are in the southeastern portion of the state, including four out of the top five, and eight of the top ten most populous counties are in either the Philadelphia or Pittsburgh Metropolitan Statistical Areas.

FIPS code

The Federal Information Processing Standard (FIPS) code, used by the United States government to uniquely identify counties, is provided with each entry. FIPS codes are five-digit numbers; for Pennsylvania the codes start with 42 and are completed with the three-digit county code. The FIPS code for each county in the table links to census data for the specific county.

County list

|}

Former counties 
Pennsylvania Colony's Three Lower Counties had been transferred from New York Colony in 1682. In 1701 these counties became a separate colony called Delaware Colony, although it shared the same colonial governor as Pennsylvania until independence in 1776.

|}

See also
List of Pennsylvania counties by per capita income
List of county seats in Pennsylvania (by population)
List of Pennsylvania Municipalities and Counties with Home Rule Charters, Optional Charters, or Optional Plans
List of municipalities in Pennsylvania
List of cities in Pennsylvania
List of towns and boroughs in Pennsylvania
List of townships in Pennsylvania

References

 
Pennsylvania
Counties